The 2012 Echo Klassik Awards were held on October 14, 2012. It is the 20th edition of the annual Echo Klassik awards for classical music. The ceremony took place in the Konzerthaus Berlin and was broadcast on ZDF. It was hosted by Nina Eichinger and Rolando Villazón and organised by The German Music Industry Association.

Performances
Alison Balsom
ensemble amarcord/Leipziger Streichquartett
Khatia Buniatishvili
David Garrett
Philippe Jaroussky
Anna Prohaska
Erwin Schrott
Klaus Florian Vogt

Orchestra
Konzerthausorchester Berlin conducted by Vasily Petrenko

Winners
The winners of the 2012 Echo Klassik awards were: 
Female Singer of the Year – Renée Fleming Poèmes 
Male Singer of the Year – Klaus Florian Vogt Helden 
Conductor of the Year – Riccardo Chailly for Beethoven symphonies
Instrumentalists of the Year
Alison Balsom (trumpet)
Eduard Brunner (clarinet)
Rudolf Buchbinder (piano)
Isabelle Faust (violin)
Harald Vogel (organ)
Ensemble of the Year
 Modern Instruments – Quatuor Ébène, for Mozart
 Historical Instruments – Freiburger Barockorchester for Mendelssohn
 Vocal Music – ensemble amarcord
 Symphonic Recording of the Year
19th century – Roger Norrington for Elgar: Enigma Variations
20th/21st century – Simon Rattle for Schoenberg
 Concerto Recording of the Year
18th century Christian Zacharias Mozart
19th century Maximilian Hornung, Bamberger Symphoniker, Sebastian Tewinkel for Saint-Saëns and Dvořák cello concertos; Maurizio Pollini Staatskapelle Dresden Christian Thielemann for Brahms; Trumpet concerto: Guliano Sommerhalder, Simone Sommerhalder,       Roland Fröscher for A. Ponchielli trumpet concertos. Violin concerto: Anne-Sophie Mutter and the New York Philharmonic for Rihm Lichtes Spiel Sebastian Currier Time Machines. 
20th/21st century – Jos Van Immerseel Anima Eterna, Bruges for Poulenc
 Opera Recording of the Year
17th/18th century – Gluck: Ezio (Gluck) Alan Curtis
19th century – Beethoven: Fidelio Claudio Abbado
20th/21st century – Franz Schreker: Irrelohe Stefan Blunier. 
Operatic Arias & Duets – Philippe Jaroussky/Max Emanuel Cenčić/William Christie (harpsichordist)/Les Arts Florissants; Nuria Rial Telemann: Opera Arias.
 Choral Recording of the Year
16th/ 17th century – J. C. Bach: Welt, gute Nacht John Eliot Gardiner
18th/19th century – Fauré: Requiem dir. Peter Dijkstra. 
20th/21st century – Coro Nacional de Cuba Digna Guerra, El canto quiere ser luz; Ligeti: Requiem, Apparitions, dir Péter Eötvös
 Chamber Music Recording of the Year 
17th/18th century strings – Amaryllis Quartett, J. Haydn, A. Webern
17th/18th century wind – Manz, Trénel, Schuch, Alonso and Quero. Mozart, Beethoven quintets. 
19th century string – Joshua Bell, Jeremy Denk French Impressions
 19th century wind – Münchner Horntrio J. Brahms, G. Ligeti, C. Koechlin. 
Mixed Ensemble – Renaud Capuçon, Gérard Caussé, Gautier Capuçon, Nicholas Angelich, Michel Dalberto, Quatuor Ebène Fauré. **20th/21st century – Martha Argerich and Friends Live from Lugano 2010. 
20th/ 21st century Strings – Galatea Quartet Bloch: Landscapes – Music for String Quartet. (Strings) Hilary Hahn, Charles Ives
 Solo Recording of the Year
17th/18th century – (Violin) Rebekka Hartmann. (Piano) Jin Ju Beethoven, Czerny, Schubert. Piano Rafał Blechacz Debussy, Szymanowski.
Song Recording of the Year – Werner Güra Schubert: Willkommen und Abschied
 Lifetime Achievement Award – Daniel Barenboim,
 Newcomer awards – Anna Prohaska (soprano), Khatia Buniatishvili (piano), Miloš Karadaglić (guitar), Julian Steckel (cello), Vasily Petrenko (conductor)
 The Klassik-ohne-Grenzen Prizes – Tori Amos Night of Hunters; Pera Ensemble and Valer Barna-Sabadus Baroque Oriental; Erwin Schrott Rojotango
 Editorial Achievement of the Year –  Mozart: Sämtliche Clavierwerke Vol. 12
 World Premiere Recording of the Year – Michala Petri, Danish National Vocal Ensemble (DR Vokalensemblet), Stephen Layton The Nightingale – New Nordic Music for Recorder and Choir Uģis Prauliņš, Daniel Börtz.
 The Classics for Children Award – Ensemble L'art pour l'art Haltbar gemacht
 Jury Awards for the Fostering of Young Talents – Die Deutsche Kammerphilharmonie Bremen "Zukunftslabor". Bertelsmann Stiftung "Musikalische Grundschule"
 Music DVD Recording of the Year – (Opera) Theater Lübeck Wagner: Der Ring des Nibelungen
 Bestseller of the Year – David Garrett Legacy
 Special Jury Awards – Israel Chamber Orchestra. Thomanerchor Leipzig

References

Echo Klassic
Echo Klassic 2012
Echo Klassic 2012